Wether Holm or Wedder Holm is the name of several Shetland Islands in Scotland. It means 'small and rounded islet of the wether'.

 Wether Holm, Hamnavoe, by Samphrey in Yell Sound
 Wether Holm, Out Skerries, in the Out Skerries
 Wether Holm, West Linga, near Whalsay
 Wedder Holm, Uyea, by Uyea, Unst